Sir Hector MacLennan FRCP FRCPGlas FRCOG (1 November 1905 – 6 January 1978) was a Scottish gynaecologist, knighted in the 1965 Birthday Honours.

He was President of the Royal Society of Medicine from 1967 to 1969.

His son, Robert was ennobled as Baron Maclennan of Rogart. His daughter was the acclaimed Elizabeth MacLennan.

References

1905 births
1978 deaths
20th-century Scottish medical doctors
British gynaecologists
Fellows of the Royal College of Physicians
Fellows of the Royal College of Physicians and Surgeons of Glasgow
Fellows of the Royal College of Obstetricians and Gynaecologists
Presidents of the Royal Society of Medicine
Knights Bachelor
20th-century surgeons